Brad Howe (born 1959) is an American sculptor from California. His work has been exhibited domestically and internationally.

Early life
Brad Howe was born in 1959 in Riverside, California. As a student of International Relations at Stanford University,  Howe attended the University of São Paulo to specialize in Literature and Economic History.  It was there that he discovered his passion for art and architecture that would eventually lead to his first exhibitions.

Career

He started his career as a sculptor in Brazil, using stainless steel, aluminum and polyurethane. He credits sculptor Alexander Calder as an early influence in his work.

Since then, he has exhibited in over eighteen countries worldwide and his works have been placed in collections in more than 32 countries, including Brazil, Mexico, France, Germany, South Korea and United States.

His work can also be found at various universities including  Massachusetts Institute of Technology (MIT) in Boston, Temple University in Philadelphia, and UCLA.

Monumental and Public Art have become a major focus of his career. Over the past ten years, he has completed over 30 public projects in 7 different countries. One of his sculptures can be seen in the city of Palo Alto, California.  Moreover, as part of the Beverly Hills Centennial Arts of Palm Installation, he designed four sculptures outside the Beverly Hills City Hall, on North Santa Monica Boulevard in Beverly Hills, California.  The Crocker Art Museum (Sacramento, California), the Honolulu Museum of Art, the Lancaster Museum of Art and History (Lancaster, California), and the Pasadena Museum of California Art (Pasadena, California) are among the museums holding work by Brad Howe.

His studio is actively completing site-specific commissions and installations for cities, universities, museums, and private corporations. Brad Howe also actively participates in group gallery shows with smaller works that serve as models, or maquettes, for his large-scale pieces.

Personal life
He resides in Los Angeles, California.

Bibliography
Brad Howe. Brad Howe: A Survey of Sculpture. Galerie Uli Lang, 2008. 48 pages.

References

External links

Official website

Living people
1959 births
Artists from Riverside, California
Artists from Los Angeles
Stanford University alumni
Sculptors from California